Krushuna Falls (Крушунски водопади) are a series of waterfalls in Northern Bulgaria, near the village of Krushuna, Letnitsa Municipality, 34 km from the city of Lovech. They are famous with their picturesque landscape and are formed by many travertines.

There is a tourist path leading to the cave where the river springs. There are two smaller waterfalls in the area, one of which is called Malkata Maara. Some other caves are also found in the vicinity - Urushka Maara, Gornik, Devetashka cave.

Remains of the 13-14th century Hesychast Krushuna Monastery dating from the Second Bulgarian Empire can be found nearby.

Waterfalls of Bulgaria
Landforms of Lovech Province
Tourist attractions in Lovech Province